is a Japanese wrestler. He competed in the men's freestyle 57 kg at the 1992 Summer Olympics.

References

1968 births
Living people
Japanese male sport wrestlers
Olympic wrestlers of Japan
Wrestlers at the 1992 Summer Olympics
Sportspeople from Tokyo
20th-century Japanese people